Charles Franklyn Nelson (March 11, 1872 – November 1, 1940) was a Canadian politician. He served in the Legislative Assembly of British Columbia from 1917 to 1920 as a Liberal member for the constituency of Slocan. He won his seat in the assembly by defeating incumbent William Hunter in the 1916 British Columbia general election by one vote (448 to 447). Nelson lived in New Denver, British Columbia and was a druggist and photographer. He died of heart disease in 1940 at the age of 68.

References

British Columbia Liberal Party MLAs
1872 births
1940 deaths